Beiyu may refer to:

 Beijing Language and Culture University, China
 Beiyu Township, Anhui, China
 Beiyu Township, Hebei, China